The 2016–17 season was Empoli Football Club's third consecutive season in Serie A. The club competed in Serie A and in the Coppa Italia. The season proved to be a slow-rolling disaster for the club, as Empoli sat in 17th place for most of the season only to suffer a poor run of form at the tail end of the season at the same time as 18th-placed Crotone enjoyed a spectacular run of results; the result was Empoli dropping into 18th place on the very last day of the season, being relegated to Serie B.

Players

Squad information

Transfers

In

Loans in

Out

Loans out

Pre-season and friendlies

Competitions

Overall

Last updated: 28 May 2017

Serie A

League table

Results summary

Results by round

Matches

Coppa Italia

Statistics

Appearances and goals

|-
! colspan=14 style=background:#DCDCDC; text-align:center| Goalkeepers

|-
! colspan=14 style=background:#DCDCDC; text-align:center| Defenders

|-
! colspan=14 style=background:#DCDCDC; text-align:center| Midfielders

|-
! colspan=14 style=background:#DCDCDC; text-align:center| Forwards

|-
! colspan=14 style=background:#DCDCDC; text-align:center| Players transferred out during the season

Goalscorers

Last updated: 28 May 2017

Clean sheets

Last updated: 28 May 2017

Disciplinary record

Last updated: 28 May 2017

References

Empoli F.C. seasons
Empoli